The Northern Luzon Heroes Hill National Park is a national park in the Republic of the Philippines, located in the municipalities of Santa and partly in Narvacan in Ilocos Sur province.  The protected area was established on July 9, 1963, by Proclamation No. 132.

Activities to the park include trekking, mountain biking or sightseeing.

See also
 List of national parks of the Philippines
 List of protected areas of the Philippines

References

National parks of the Philippines
Protected areas established in 1963
1963 establishments in the Philippines
Geography of Ilocos Sur
Landforms of Ilocos Sur
Hills of the Philippines
Tourist attractions in Ilocos Sur